Igali may refer to:

People
 Daniel Igali (born 1974), Canadian freestyle wrestler
 Godknows Igali, Nigerian public servant, diplomat, author and scholar

Places
 Igali, Republic of Dagestan, Russia